Gong Maoxin and Peng Hsien-yin were the defending champions, but Peng chose not to participate this year. Gong chose to partner with Yi.

Gong failed to defend his title, losing in the finals to Matt Reid and John-Patrick Smith 6–3, 7–5.

Seeds

Draw

References
 Main Draw

Lecoq Seoul Open - Men's Doubles